The Chief Justice of Cyprus was the head of the Supreme Court of Cyprus until 1961.

The administration of Cyprus was taken over by the British government, following the Russo-Turkish War, under the Convention of 4 June 1878. Charles Alfred Cookson was appointed in that year as Chief Justice and Attorney General. Following the outbreak of hostilities between the two countries in 1914, the island was annexed by the British Crown. The country became independent on 16 August 1960.

The Supreme Court of Cyprus was established in 1883.

Until 1960, there was a right of appeal from the Supreme Court of Cyprus to the Judicial Committee of the Privy Council, which was terminated under the terms of Section 5 the Cyprus Act 1960

List of Chief Justices of Cyprus

References

Cyprus
Lists of political office-holders in Cyprus
Chief justices
Cyprus history-related lists